The 2016–17 Alpe Adria Cup, also known as Sixt Alpe Adria Cup due to sponsorship reasons, was the second edition of Alpe Adria Cup. It started on 29 September 2016.

Thirteen teams from four countries joined the competition and were divided into three groups of three teams and one group with four teams. Top two team from each group qualified for the quarterfinals.

Regular season

Group A

Group B

Group C

Group D

Quarterfinals

|}

Semifinals

|}

Finals

|}

References

External links
Official website
Alpe Adria Cup at Eurobasket.com

2016–17
2016–17 in European basketball leagues
2016–17 in Croatian basketball
2016–17 in Slovenian basketball
2016–17 in Slovak basketball
2016–17 in Austrian basketball
2016–17 in Czech basketball